India Catalina (1495- May 11, 1538) was an indigenous child of Mokaná ethnicity from the Colombian Atlantic coast, who accompanied Pedro de Heredia as an interpreter and intermediary, playing a role in the Spanish conquest of Colombia.

History
Catalina, the daughter of a local chief, was abducted in 1509 by Spanish conquistador Diego de Nicuesa from an indigenous settlement known as Zamba o Galerazamba in the department of Bolívar. She was sent to Santo Domingo, where she learned the Spanish language and adopted the Catholic Christian faith, although she was still considered a slave. She served as an interpreter to the Native Americans under Pedro de Heredia during his conquest of Colombia. She was also his concubine for many years,  but after she took him to court for stealing gold, it is possible that Pedro had her married to his nephew Alonso Montañez. She died in Cartagena de Indias on May 11, 1538.

The name "india (the indian) Catalina" appeared in a letter sent for Pedro de Heredia to King Carlos V in 1533. Her indigenous name was never mentioned in the documents.

Monument

The monument to India Catalina was sculpted by Eladio Gil Zambrana and presented to the public in 1974. Small scale replicas are used in the Cartagena Film Festival awards.

See also
 La Malinche
 Sacagawea

References

Lecturas: Fin de Semana El Tiempo newspaper, pag. 2, Vicente Martinez Emilliani, September 9, 2006
Dr. Luis Fernando Villanueva
BIOGRAFÍAS DE HOMBRES ILUSTRES Ó NOTABLES, Relativas á la época del Descubrimiento, Conquista y Colonización de la parte de América denominada actualmente Estados Unidos de Colombia. Doña Soledad Acosta De Samper, 1883

External links
Places of interest in Cartagena
Wikimedia Commons has a multimedia category named India Catalina.

1490s births
1500s missing person cases
1529 deaths
Indigenous peoples in Colombia
History of Colombia
Spanish colonization of the Americas
Monuments and memorials in Colombia
Colombian women
Converts to Roman Catholicism from pagan religions
Women in war in Colombia
Buildings and structures in Cartagena, Colombia
Monuments of Colombia
Kidnapped Colombian people
People from Bolívar Department
Women in 16th-century warfare
16th-century translators